Krysta Anne Rodriguez (born July 23, 1984) is an American actress and singer. She is best known for her roles as Ana Vargas in the NBC series Smash, Summer Henderson in the NBC series Trial & Error, Maxine Griffin in the ABC series Quantico and Ms. Crumble in the Netflix comedy series Daybreak.

Early life and career
Rodriguez grew up in Orange County, California. She began taking dance lessons at the age of 13, after being involved with cheerleading in middle school. After traveling to New York and seeing eight Broadway shows, she realized performers had to sing and act as well as dance, so once she returned home Rodriguez began taking singing and acting lessons. She was a cast member of the Christian television show Colby's Clubhouse from 1995 to 2000. She attended Orange County High School of the Arts where she played many lead roles including Marian in The Music Man, as well as the lead role in Gidget: The Musical, a musical co-written and directed by Francis Ford Coppola, that starred Orange County High School of the Arts students during its (ultimately unsuccessful) tryouts in 2000. She attended New York University for a few years, but began working soon after enrolling. Rodriguez said of her education, "[A]lthough I would have loved to finish I did not get that opportunity because I started working. So…no degree in musical theater, but so far an okay career."

Career
Rodriguez made her Broadway debut in the short-lived 2005 jukebox musical Good Vibrations. She later became a replacement for the role of Bebe in the Broadway revival of A Chorus Line in 2007. She has played numerous ensemble and understudy parts in the Broadway productions of Spring Awakening and In the Heights, as well as a regional production of The Boy Friend directed by Julie Andrews. She made her feature film debut in the role of Krysta in the 2010 film The Virginity Hit.

Beginning performances in fall 2009, Rodriguez originated the role of Wednesday Addams in the world premiere Chicago try-out run of the new Broadway-bound musical The Addams Family, based on the cartoons of Charles Addams. From March 2010, the show received its planned debut at New York's Lunt-Fontanne Theatre. After playing the role for over a year and lending her voice to the show's original cast recording, Rodriguez left the musical on March 8, 2011, and was replaced by Rachel Potter.

Other credits include an Encores! production of Bye Bye Birdie. Her first television role was a guest appearance as the character Jordan Steele in Gossip Girl. In 2011, Rodriguez starred in the television movie Iceland as Rose, one of a group of friends who reunite to heal and nurture each other after the death of one of their own.

In 2012, Rodriguez starred in another television movie Shadow of Fear as Lauren. The movie is about the push and pull between a schizophrenic new waiter and a popular young waitress. In 2013, she guest starred in the web series created by Mitchell Jarvis and Wesley Taylor, It Could Be Worse. She played an assistant to a Broadway Star named Bridgett/Bridget in two episodes, titled "Payment Plan" and "Let Your Hair Down".

Rodriguez joined the cast of the NBC series Smash for its second, and final, season in 2013, playing the role of Ana Vargas, an aspiring Broadway performer and the new roommate of Katharine McPhee's character Karen.

In July 2013, Rodriguez returned to Broadway playing Casey in First Date, co-starring with Zachary Levi.

In December 2013, Rodriguez appeared in Hit List, a concert presentation of the fictional musical created for the second season of Smash, as The Diva/Sarah Smith. Rodriguez was scheduled to have a major role in the planned CBS sitcom How I Met Your Dad; a spinoff and successor to the long-running sitcom How I Met Your Mother, but on March 25, 2014, it was announced that Rodriguez had exited the pilot. (The proposed spin-off would ultimately not be picked up.)

Rodriguez guest starred on Married in 2014, as Kim, a friend of a couple desperately trying to save their marriage. On Ian, Rodriguez guest starred as Fly Girl. Additionally, Rodriguez starred in the Lifetime holiday movie entitled Wishin' and Hopin' in the role of Annette Funicello, a teen idol, movie actress and Mickey Mouse Club Mousekteer.

Also, in the fall of 2014 Rodriguez was diagnosed with breast cancer. In 2015, Rodriguez started the website ChemoCouture.com to create a blog detailing her journey during chemotherapy as well as providing various fashion, beauty, and wellness tips that she employs during her battle with cancer. After going public with her diagnosis, Rodriguez was contacted by Cosmopolitan to blog for their Cosmo Online Health and Fitness readers about her experiences.

In 2015, Rodriguez was cast as Vanessa, a straight talking, no-nonsense cancer patient ready to share her truth, in a multi-episode arc in the second season of the ABC Family television show Chasing Life. The season aired in the summer of 2015.

Also in 2015, she played Madison in an episode of Inside Amy Schumer. Krysta also guest starred in an episode of The Mysteries of Laura as April Watkins.

Rodriguez starred in the 2016 film Bakery in Brooklyn as Chloe, one of the lead characters.

Through June 14, 2015, she returned to star as Ilse in the Deaf West Theatre production of Spring Awakening, held at the Wallis Annenberg Center for the Performing Arts in Beverly Hills, California. The Los Angeles Times featured her in an article about her return to the production that she helped to create on Broadway. In July 2015, it was announced that the production would be transferring to Broadway with its current cast for a limited engagement at the Brooks Atkinson Theatre. Rodriguez performed in the Broadway revival from September 8, 2015, through its closing on January 24, 2016. The show ran two weeks past its intended run due to its rave reviews, and garnered three Tony Award nominations including Best Revival of a Musical.

Rodriguez performed in the Off-Broadway production of What We're Up Against, a play about how women are treated in the workplace. It shows the inequality of women and how nothing has changed in the past twenty-five years. She played "Eliza, a sharp young architect who [was] new to the firm". The show ran from October 28 through December 3, 2017. This was the first time Rodriguez and Skylar Astin worked together since Spring Awakening in 2006.

In 2017, Rodriguez starred as Summer Henderson in the NBC comedy series Trial & Error. In the same year, it was announced that Rodriguez was cast in the recurring role of Maxine Griffin in the second season of ABC's thriller series Quantico.

In 2018, it was announced that Rodriguez was cast in the main role of Ms. Crumble in the Netflix comedy-drama series Daybreak.

Rodriguez made her solo debut at Feinstein's/54 Below from September 10–14, 2019, directed by Ben Rauhala. Special guests included Kathryn Gallagher, Andy Mientus, Joe Iconis, Megan McGinnis, Jelani Alladin, and Adam Josef Levy.

In 2021, Rodriguez appeared in the role of Liza Minnelli in the Netflix miniseries Halston. In 2022, she co-starred with Santino Fontana in the Hallmark Channel film Just One Kiss.

In September 2022, Rodriguez starred as Cinderella in the 2022 Broadway revival of Into the Woods. She left the production in November of that year.

Credits

Theatre

Television

Film

Internet

Awards and nominations

References

External links

Krysta Rodriguez at the Internet Off-Broadway Database

1984 births
Living people
21st-century American actresses
21st-century American singers
21st-century American women singers 
Actresses from Orange County, California
American musical theatre actresses
American television actresses
Orange County School of the Arts alumni
People from Orange, California
Singers from California